OEPA may refer to:

OEPA, the ICAO airport code for Al Qaisumah/Hafr Al Batin Airport
 Office of the Environmental Protection Authority, provides administrative support for the Environmental Protection Authority of Western Australia
Ohio Environmental Protection Agency